Simpang Ampek (or Simpang Empat) is a town or Sub-district in West Pasaman Regency, of West Sumatra province of Indonesia and it is the seat (capital) of West Pasaman Regency.

Populated places in West Sumatra
Regency seats of West Sumatra